Ragnar Arthur Granit  (30 October 1900 – 12 March 1991) was a Finnish-Swedish scientist who was awarded the Nobel Prize in Physiology or Medicine in 1967 along with Haldan Keffer Hartline and George Wald "for their discoveries concerning the primary physiological and chemical visual processes in the eye".

Early life and education
Ragnar Arthur Granit was born on 30 October 1900 in Riihimäki, Finland, at the time part of the Russian Empire, into a Swedish-speaking Finnish family. Granit was raised in Oulunkylä, a suburb of the Finnish capital of Helsinki, and attended the Svenska normallyceum in Helsinki.

Granit graduated from the Faculty of Medicine at the University of Helsinki in 1927.

Career and research
In 1940, when Finland became the target of a massive Soviet attack during the Winter War, Granit sought refuge – and peaceful surroundings for his studies and research work – in Stockholm, the capital of neighbouring Sweden, at the age of 40. In 1941, Granit received Swedish citizenship, which made it possible for him to live and continue with his work without having to worry about the Continuation War, which lasted in Finland until 1945. Granit was proud of his Finnish-Swedish roots and remained a patriotic Finnish-Swede throughout his life, maintaining homes in both in Finland and Sweden after the Moscow Armistice ended the Continuation War and secured Finnish independence.

Granit was professor of neurophysiology at the Karolinska Institute from 1946 to his retirement in 1967.

Awards and honors
Granit was elected an International Member of the American Philosophical Society in 1954. In 1960, Granit was elected a Foreign Member of the Royal Society (ForMemRS).

In 1967 he was awarded the Nobel Prize in Physiology or Medicine. Granit said that he was a "fifty-fifty" Finnish and Swedish Nobel laureate. He was elected an International Member of the United States National Academy of Sciences the following year. In 1971, he was elected an International Honorary Member of the American Academy of Arts and Sciences.

Death
Granit died on 12 March 1991 in Stockholm at the age of 90. Granit and his wife Marguerite, who died the same year, were buried in a church cemetery on the Finnish island of Korpo.

References

External links
  including the Nobel Lecture December 12, 1967 The Development of Retinal Neurophysiology
 

1900 births
1991 deaths
Nobel laureates in Physiology or Medicine
Finnish Nobel laureates
Swedish Nobel laureates
Academic staff of the Karolinska Institute
Foreign Members of the Royal Society
Foreign associates of the National Academy of Sciences
People from Vantaa
Swedish-speaking Finns
Finnish neuroscientists
Swedish neuroscientists
Finnish physiologists
Finnish emigrants to Sweden
20th-century Finnish physicians
Vitamin researchers
Members of the American Philosophical Society